The Vikosen Nature Reserve is located in the municipality of Sortland in Nordland county, Norway.

The area is protected in order to safeguard an important wetland area with natural flora and fauna, especially for its function as a nationally significant area used by the pink-footed goose during migration. It offers the geese a much-needed gathering and resting point during their strenuous spring migration.

County Road 956 passes through the village of Vik along the northwest shore of the reserve, and County Road 820 to Sortland runs along the southwest shore.

References

External links
 Vikosen naturreservat. Map and description of the nature reserve.
 Miljødirektoratet. 2016. Vikosen naturreservat. Sortland kommune, Nordland fylke. 1:8,000 map of the nature reserve.
 Lofoten og Vesterålen jordskifterett. 2009. Vikosen naturreservat. Sortland kommune. Nordland. 1:2,500 map of the nature reserve.

Nature reserves in Norway
Protected areas of Nordland
Sortland
Protected areas established in 2000